Deforestation in Malaysia is a major environmental issue in the country. Logging and land clearing, particularly for the palm oil sector, have been significant contributors to Malaysia's economy. However, as a megadiverse country, efforts have been made to conserve Malaysia's forests and reduce the rate of deforestation.

Background
Malaysia declared its independence from Britain in 1957, and formed its current state in 1963. Since then, it has seen significant economic growth, a large part of which can be attributed to its forest industry. Malaysia's rapid rate of development has put it far ahead of several of its neighbours, such as Indonesia and Papua New Guinea. This has largely been in part to its abundance of natural resources, which constitutes significant portions of the country's economic sector. Because of this large financial gain from logging, production has been high since initiation, and it was not until 1985 that consequences were first realised.

Economics

Malaysia has received considerable financial gain from its logging industry. One statistic states this benefit is valued at US$2,150,000,000. Together with neighbouring Indonesia, Malaysia produces 85% of the global supply of palm oil, the chief cause of logging. Additionally, the agriculture sector accounts for 14.5% of the labour force – more than 1 in 7 persons. 56.6% of Malaysia's tropical forests are used for production, leaving the rest for uses such as 'Protection' and 'Conservation'.

Impacts
Consequences have been varied across different parts of Malaysia. However, all areas have suffered some effect from deforestation. Four of the most prominent include:
 Malaysia ranks as the 21st most biodiverse country in the world, with 2,199 endemic species. 18% of these species are listed as 'threatened', and because they are endemic, if Malaysia fails to conserve them, extinction will result.
 Indigenous peoples in Malaysia have always depended on the rainforest for medicine, shelter, food, and other necessities. They are not known to take more than what they need as this would be seen as a transgression of the forest and would bring curses to their people. The destruction of their prime resource is resulting in the destruction of their traditional ways of life. As the forest disappears, so does their culture.
 Runoff has also increased. Though it would not be immediately suspected that logging deep in the jungle could affect a distant city on the coast, because there is less forested area to soak up rainwater and act as a slow-release reservoir, sudden floods are becoming more and more frequent.
 An increased rate of mudslides have been reported.

Conservation efforts
In Malaysia, the World Bank estimates that trees are being cut down at 4 times the sustainable rate. Logging does not have to be as destructive a practice as it currently is in Malaysia. In the past 2 decades, Malaysia has moved towards diversifying its economy, but logging still draws in many because of poor regulation and high profit. The most effective way to combat the negative effects of logging would be tighter regulation that still allows high production of palm oil, but in a more sustainable manner. This way, not only will the effects be mitigated now, but there will be more forests to log, and thus profits to make, in the future.

, Malaysia still has a relatively high forest coverage percentage. It was estimated that 59.9% of the total area is covered by forests, of which, a sizeable portion are untouched virgin forests (see old-growth forests) which dates back to around 130 million years.

An increase in the level of awareness of Malaysians compounded with the local folk belief that existed in the indigenous populations (see Semai people) has added to the strength of the many Malaysian movements in environmentalism. The Malaysian Nature Society is active in advocating protection of forest. Other organisations such as the Tabung Alam Malaysia, a branch of the World Wide Fund For Nature has also established offices in Malaysia since 1972 dedicated to nature conservation as well as education on the importance of forest conservation to the wider populace. The Forest Research Institute Malaysia has also been actively conducting research on the biodiversity of Malaysia's forests as well as in conservation.

Current issues
The opposition in Pahang linked illegal logging to the damage caused by the 2020–2021 Malaysian floods. The state government denied this link, but ordered all logging halted during the monsoon season.

Deforestation in the following areas/ project sites have attracted controversy:

 Terengganu
 Hulu Terengganu Hydroelectric Project

 Pahang
 Kelau Forest Reserve

 Johor
 Sungai Mas Forest
 Pulai River Mangrove Forest

 Kelantan
 Gunung Stong Selatan Forest Reserve
 Loging Forest Reserve

 Perak
 Teluk Rubiah
 Belum-Temenggor

 Selangor
 Bukit Cherakah
 Kuala Langat
 Sungai Jelok

See also
 Deforestation in Borneo
 Environmental issues in Malaysia
 List of environmental issues
 Palm oil production in Malaysia
Peninsular Malaysian rain forests, Peninsular Malaysian peat swamp forests, Peninsular Malaysian montane rain forests

References

Environmental issues in Malaysia
Malaysia
Forestry in Malaysia